Aleksandar Dragović (born 6 March 1991) is an Austrian professional footballer who plays as a centre-back for Serbian SuperLiga club Red Star Belgrade and the Austria national team. He is well known for his performances as a tough-tackling centre-back.

Club career

Austria Wien
Dragović started his career by playing in the youth teams of Austrian giants Austria Wien and started playing for their B-squad in 2007. In summer 2009 he advanced to their first team, for whom he played 66 championship games. There were also 15 games in the Europa League and 10 games in the Austrian Cup, which he won with Austria in 2009.

Basel
On 1 February 2011, Swiss Super League club FC Basel announced that they has signed Dragović on a four and a half year contract. He joined Basel's first team during the winter break of their 2011–12 season under head coach Thorsten Fink. Dragović played his domestic league debut for his new club in the home game in the St. Jakob-Park on 12 February 2011 as Basel won 3–0 against FC St. Gallen. He was in the starting eleven of every match until the end of the 2010–11 Swiss Super League season and Dragović won the Swiss Championship title with Basel. 

To the beginning of their 2011–12 season season Dragović was member of the Basel team that won the 2011 Uhrencup, beating both Hertha Berlin 3–0 and West Ham United 2–1 to lead the table on goal difference above Young Boys. The team entered the 2011–12 UEFA Champions League in the group stage. On 7 December 2011, during the Champions League group C match at home in the St. Jakob-Park Dragović helped Basel defeat Manchester United to make his team become the first Swiss club to advance to the knockout stage of a Champions League. Basel won the match 2–1, sending United out of the Champions league. But in the round of 16, despite a 1–0 home win against Bayern Munich, it was the German team who advanced to the next round.

Dragović scored his first league goal for his new club on 1 October 2011 in the 3–0 home win against Servette FC. At the end of the 2011–12 season he won the Double with his new club. They won the League Championship title with 20 points advantage. The team won the Swiss Cup, winning the final 4–2 in a penalty shootout against Luzern.

Basel had started in the 2012–13 UEFA Champions League in the qualifying rounds. But were knocked out of the competition by CFR Cluj in the play-off round. They then continued in the 2012–13 UEFA Europa League group stage. Ending the group in second position, Basel continued in the knockout phase. Dragović scored a goal in the second leg of quarter-final matches against Tottenham Hotspur, whom they beat 4–1 on penalties after a 4–4 aggregate draw to progress to the semi-finals. In the semi-finals, Basel were matched against the reigning UEFA Champions League holders Chelsea. Chelsea won both games advancing 5–2 on aggregate, eventually winning the competition. Basel played a total of 20 European matches that season. Dragović missed solely the second leg of the semi-final at Stamford Bridge due to a yellow card suspension, but had played in all the other European ties.

In the 2012–13 domestic championship Dragović played in 32 of the 36 games and he scored three goals. In the away game in the Stade de Genève on 3 March 2013 Dragović scored his teams first goal after Valentin Stocker played a pass from the bye-line backwards into the centre and Dragović slotted home from short range. After Servette had equalised, Dragović headed home a corner, taken by team captain Alex Frei, to the 2–1 final score. Celebrating his goal, Dragović raised his arm in gesture. But referee Sascha Amhof understood this as rude gesture against the Servette fans and showed the scorer a yellow card. Because this was his second card in the game, Dragović was dismissed. His third goal of the season was ten matchdays later in the home game in the St. Jakob-Park as Basel won 2–0 against the same opponent, Servette. At the end of the 2012–13 league season he won the Championship title with the team. In the 2012–13 Swiss Cup Basel reached the final, but were runners up behind Grasshopper Club, being defeated 4–3 on penalties, following a 1–1 draw after extra time.

On 26 July 2013 it was announced that Dragović was leaving Basel and had signed for Dynamo Kyiv. During his time with the club Dragović played a total of 142 games for Basel scoring a total of nine goals. 77 of these games were in the Swiss Super League, eight in the Swiss Cup, 27 in the UEFA competitions (Champions League and Europa League) and 30 were friendly games. He scored four goals in the domestic league, one in the European games and the other was scored during the test games.

Dynamo Kyiv
On 26 July 2013, Dragović had signed a five-year contract with Ukrainian club FC Dynamo Kyiv. On 17 May 2015, Dragović helped Dynamo beat Dnipro 1–0 which was the game that won Dynamo their first Ukrainian Premier League title in six years.

On 4 November 2015, Dragović scored his first ever UEFA Champions League goal in the group stage against Chelsea at Stamford Bridge on the 78th minute, as well as scoring an own goal on the 34th. Dynamo ended up losing that match 2–1. In that season he helped Dynamo reach the last sixteen of the UEFA Champions League for the first time in 16 years, getting knocked out by Manchester City 1–3 on aggregate.

Bayer 04 Leverkusen
On 22 August 2016, Dragović signed a five-year contract with German club Bayer 04 Leverkusen.

Leicester City (loan)
On 31 August 2017, Dragović joined Premier League club Leicester City on a season-long loan from Bayer Leverkusen.

Red Star Belgrade 
On 26 May 2021, Dragović signed a three-year contract with Red Star Belgrade.

International career

Dragović also used to be part of the national under-17 and under-19 Austrian teams. He was called up for the national team of Austria for their 2010 FIFA World Cup qualification match against Romania, but due to an injury he was unable to play. He was called up again by the Austrian head coach Dietmar Constantini for the match against Serbia. He made his international debut in this match on 6 June 2009. Dragović scored his first goal on 18 November 2014 in a 1–2 home defeat to Brazil.

He made the final squad for Euro 2016, where he was sent-off in the first game against Hungary, and missed a penalty in the decisive match against Iceland, which ended in a 2–1 defeat.

Dragović was part of the Austrian team which qualified to the Euro 2020 round of 16. On 29 March 2022, he played his 100th match for Austria in a 2–2 draw against Scotland.

Personal life
Dragović was born in Vienna to parents from Belgrade, Serbia. His favourite team is Red Star Belgrade, which he ended up joining in 2021.

In May 2012, then twenty-one-year-old Dragović attracted criticism in Swiss media for playfully slapping the Swiss defence and sport minister Ueli Maurer's bald head during FC Basel's Swiss Cup win medal ceremony. After making further comments about being reluctant to apologize—stating that "on the inside everybody knows, so I believe, that it was very, very much fun doing it"—Dragović reportedly traveled to the Bundeshaus in Berne in order to personally apologize to Maurer.

Career statistics

Club

International

Scores and results list Austria's goal tally first, score column indicates score after each Dragović goal.

Honours

Club
Austria Wien
Austrian Cup: 2008–09
Basel
Swiss Super League: 2010–11, 2011–12, 2012–13
Swiss Cup: 2012

Dynamo Kyiv
Ukrainian Premier League: 2014–15, 2015–16
Ukrainian Cup: 2013–14, 2014–15
Ukrainian Super Cup: 2016

Red Star Belgrade
Serbian SuperLiga: 2021–22
Serbian Cup: 2021–22

Individual
  Swiss Golden Player Award: "Best Defender" 2012
  Europa League team of the group stage: 2012

References

External links
Aleksandar Dragović player info at the official Austria Wien website 

 

1991 births
Living people
Footballers from Vienna
Association football defenders
FK Austria Wien players
Austrian footballers
Austria youth international footballers
Austria international footballers
Austrian Football Bundesliga players
FC Basel players
Swiss Super League players
Austrian people of Serbian descent
FC Dynamo Kyiv players
Ukrainian Premier League players
Bayer 04 Leverkusen players
Bundesliga players
Austrian expatriate footballers
Expatriate footballers in Ukraine
Expatriate footballers in Switzerland
Expatriate footballers in Germany
Austrian expatriate sportspeople in Ukraine
Austrian expatriate sportspeople in Switzerland
Austrian expatriate sportspeople in Germany
UEFA Euro 2016 players
UEFA Euro 2020 players
Serb diaspora sportspeople
Leicester City F.C. players
Expatriate footballers in England
Austrian expatriate sportspeople in England
Premier League players
Red Star Belgrade footballers
Serbian SuperLiga players
Expatriate footballers in Serbia
FIFA Century Club
Austrian expatriate sportspeople in Serbia